Spinifex littoreus is a species of herb in the family Poaceae. The species is similar to Spinifex longifolius. It is native to tropical and subtropical areas of Asia and Australia.

The species is dioecious. It has been suggested that the species might give an significant model for studying the regulation as well as the evolutionary history of C4 and CAM photosynthesis.

Occurrence 
The species is native to Bangladesh, Cambodia, China, India, Japan, Malaysia, Maldives, Indonesia, Myanmar, Papua New Guinea, Philippines, Sri Lanka, Taiwan, Thailand, Vietnam, and Australia.

References 

Panicoideae
Grasses of Asia
Poales of Australia
Taxa named by Nicolaas Laurens Burman